KSKN (channel 22) is a television station in Spokane, Washington, United States, affiliated with The CW. It is owned by Tegna Inc. alongside CBS affiliate KREM (channel 2). Both stations share studios on South Regal Street in Spokane, while KSKN's transmitter is on Krell Hill southeast of Spokane.

KSKN began broadcasting full programming in December 1983 as an independent station and remained on the air for less than four years, during which two successive owners filed for bankruptcy. It did not return to the air until 1994, airing home shopping programs until KREM took control of its operations in 1997. The station then affiliated with UPN and later The WB before becoming Spokane's CW affiliate in 2006. KSKN airs local morning and 10 p.m. newscasts from the KREM newsroom.

History

Early years
In 1982, Broadcast Vision Television, a company owned by Lee Schulman, obtained the construction permit for KSKN and began construction on what would be the city's second UHF outlet after KAYU-TV (channel 28). Schulman planned for a news department, even including space for news in the station's offices at E4022 Broadway.

KSKN signed on the air for a preview on September 30, 1983, airing a performance of the play Gypsy from the Spokane Civic Theatre. However, the station did not begin full-time broadcasting as a general-entertainment independent station until December 18. Broadcast Vision Television filed for bankruptcy in April 1985. The station scaled back operations to daily from 9 a.m. to 11 p.m. The station added more barter shows and dropped the stronger programming. Judgments from this first bankruptcy case continued to be awarded in federal court to creditors as late as 1988.

In September 1985, KSKN was sold to Sun Continental Group over the objection of one of Broadcast Vision Television's creditors. The new owners, former owners of independent station KZAZ in Tucson, Arizona, returned the station to stronger programming and added most of the shows the previous owners lost. Tragedy struck on March 1, 1986, when Gene Adelstein died at the age of 55 while playing tennis in West Palm Beach, Florida. Ellen, Gene's widow, headed up the operation of the station. However, she had doubted the idea of buying into Spokane from the start. The station's finances began to deteriorate not long after. In February 1987, the station trimmed two and a half hours out of its broadcast day; in March, the station filed for bankruptcy again, and in May, it began airing home shopping programs 10 hours a day. On June 27, 1987, the ailing station went off the air.

Return to air
After a 1990 attempt to return the station to air with the ill-fated Star Television Network failed, the station remained off the air until emerging in late 1994 with primarily Home Shopping Network programming. Mel Querio was the primary owner of the station; he died in 1996 and was succeeded by his wife Judy.

In July 1996, KSKN entered into a local marketing agreement with KREM, which was owned by The Providence Journal Company at the time.  The next year, the station joined UPN and began airing a 10 p.m. newscast produced by KREM; at the time, KAYU was not airing a newscast. Programming from The WB was added in 1999. The Providence Journal Company was bought by the Belo Corporation in 1997, and after the 1999 legalization of duopolies, Belo purchased KSKN for $5 million in 2001.

The next year, KSKN became an exclusive affiliate of The WB and began airing its shows in pattern, having previously displaced them to other timeslots to air UPN prime time shows; UPN migrated to a new station, KQUP (channel 24). KSKN then affiliated with The CW in September 2006 when The WB and UPN merged, by which time KQUP had dropped UPN programming. (UPN was seen for the remainder of its existence in overnight time periods on KXLY-TV.)

In 2013, Belo was acquired by the Gannett Company, which split into print (Gannett) and broadcasting (Tegna) divisions in 2015.

Technical information

Subchannels
The station's digital signal is multiplexed:

Analog-to-digital conversion
KSKN discontinued regular programming on its analog signal, over UHF channel 22, on June 12, 2009, the official date in which full-power television stations in the United States transitioned from analog to digital broadcasts under federal mandate. The station's digital signal remained on its pre-transition UHF channel 36, using virtual channel 22.

Translator
 Bonners Ferry, ID: K25MP-D

Notes

References

The CW affiliates
Laff (TV network) affiliates
Quest (American TV network) affiliates
Tegna Inc.
Television channels and stations established in 1983
1983 establishments in Washington (state)
SKN
Former Gannett subsidiaries